Helena Valley Northwest is a census-designated place (CDP) in Lewis and Clark County, Montana, United States. The population was 3,482 at the 2010 census. It is part of the Helena Micropolitan Statistical Area.

Geography
Helena Valley Northwest is located at  (46.721256, -112.044004).

Demographics

As of the census of 2000, there were 2,082 people, 741 households, and 603 families residing in the CDP. The population density was 127.3 people per square mile (49.1/km2). There were 769 housing units at an average density of 47.0/sq mi (18.1/km2). The racial makeup of the CDP was 96.06% White, 0.10% African American, 1.78% Native American, 0.72% Asian, 0.05% Pacific Islander, 0.43% from other races, and 0.86% from two or more races. Hispanic or Latino of any race were 1.44% of the population.

There were 741 households, out of which 41.2% had children under the age of 18 living with them, 69.8% were married couples living together, 8.5% had a female householder with no husband present, and 18.5% were non-families. 14.7% of all households were made up of individuals, and 2.4% had someone living alone who was 65 years of age or older. The average household size was 2.81 and the average family size was 3.09.

In the CDP, the population was spread out, with 29.4% under the age of 18, 6.9% from 18 to 24, 32.3% from 25 to 44, 26.9% from 45 to 64, and 4.5% who were 65 years of age or older. The median age was 35 years. For every 100 females, there were 103.5 males. For every 100 females age 18 and over, there were 99.9 males.

The median income for a household in the CDP was $45,385, and the median income for a family was $50,714. Males had a median income of $33,906 versus $24,773 for females. The per capita income for the CDP was $17,910. About 5.6% of families and 8.2% of the population were below the poverty line, including 8.6% of those under age 18 and none of those age 65 or over.

References

Census-designated places in Lewis and Clark County, Montana
Census-designated places in Montana
Helena, Montana micropolitan area